Patriarch Paul I may refer to:

 Paul I of Constantinople, Patriarch in 337–339, 341–342 and 346–350
 Patriarch Paul of Alexandria, Greek Patriarch of Alexandria in 537–542
 Paul I, Serbian Patriarch, Archbishop of Peć and Serbian Patriarch c. 1530 to 1541
 Paul Peter Massad, Maronite Patriarch of Antioch in 1854–1890
 Pavle, Serbian Patriarch, 44th Patriarch of the Serbian Orthodox Church, in 1990–2009

See also
Paul I (disambiguation)